Geetha Gandhi is a 1949 Indian, Tamil-language film produced and directed by Krishnaswami Subrahmanyam. The film stars T. R. Ramachandran and B. S. Saroja.

Plot 
Subbaiyer is an old man whose granddaughter, Girija is studying in Annamalai University. She comes home by train. At Egmore railway station, an unknown woman hands over an infant child asking the girl to hold it for a moment. While Girija is doing so, the woman intentionally jumps in front of a train. Shocked by this, Girija goes to the police, but they taunt her. She goes home with the baby and is mistreated in the same way. In the meantime, two men travel in a train. One is Dr. Chander and the other is Gopu, who takes revenge on Dr. Chander for insulting him. Gopu takes the identity of Chander and sends him to a mental asylum. Gopu "invents" a medicine (Andev Pazhani) and becomes rich. Gopu's sister Sarada, who is a nurse, falls in love with him (in parallel). Girija is sent to the mental asylum for drowning the abandoned baby at the beach. Subbaiyer is saddened by the turn of events and takes it upon himself to bring back happiness in the family. What he does, forms the rest of the story.

Cast 
The list is compiled from the database of Film News Anandan and from the review article in the Hindu newspaper and the song book

Male Cast
T. R. Ramachandran as Subbaiyer
M. R. S. Mani as Doctor Chander
V. Kumar as Gopu
K. Viswanathan
Pandit Bholonath Sharma
Vinayaka Mudaliar

Female Cast
P. A. Periyanayaki as Sarada
B. S. Saroja as Girija
Baby Padma as Baby Padma
R. Padma as Kamakshi
Lakshmiprabha
K. S. Angamuthu as Angurbala
Dance
Lalitha-Padmini

Production 
Krishnaswami Subrahmanyam produced the film under his own banner Madras United Artistes Corporation. As a follower of Mahatma Gandhi, Subrahmanyam made films like Sevasadanam, Thyagabhoomi and Balayogini with social themes relevant to Gandhian principles. This is another on the same lines.

Subrahmanyam's daughter, who was known as Baby Padma featured in this film as a child artiste. There was a dance sequence by Lalitha and Padmini, a dance drama. B. S. Saroja and Pandit Bholonath Sharma performed a fine dance as well. Choreography was handled by Pandit Bholonath Sharma, Katak, and Muthusami. Makeup was done by Haribabu, Somu and Gopal.

Soundtrack 
Music was composed by Pandurangan and Brother Lakshmanan while the lyrics were penned by Meenakshi Subrahmaniam. The songs were recorded by T. R. Ramachandran and R. Ramachandran. Padma sang two songs in the film. One song was in praise of Mahatma Gandhi and the other was about her ambition in life. There was a line in the lyrics that said she will become a dancer and stage her dance in America. It is significant because in later years she became a world renowned Bharatanatyam dancer. Singers are P. A. Periyanayaki, Baby Padma.

Reception 
The film did not perform well at the box office.

References 

Indian drama films
Indian black-and-white films
1940s Tamil-language films
Films directed by K. Subramanyam
Films scored by C. N. Pandurangan
Films scored by Br Lakshmanan
1949 drama films
1949 films